The 1973 Cork Senior Football Championship was the 85th staging of the Cork Senior Football Championship since its establishment by the Cork County Board in 1887. The draw for the opening round fixtures took place on 28 January 1973. The championship began on 1 April 1973 and ended on 30 September 1973.

Nemo Rangers entered the championship as the defending champions, however, they were defeated by St. Finbarr's in the first round.

On 30 September 1973, University College Cork won the championship following a 3-08 to 1-10 defeat of Carbery in the final. This was their 8th championship title overall and their first since 1969.

Millstreet's Jim Kenneally was the championship's top scorer with 3-20.

Team changes

To Championship

Promoted from the Cork Intermediate Football Championship
 Dohenys

Results

First round

Second round

Quarter-finals

Semi-finals

Final

Career statistics

Top scorers

Top scorers overall

Top scorers in a single game

References

Cork Senior Football Championship